Vito Melis (May 10, 1909 – October 23, 1976) was an Italian boxer who competed in the 1932 Summer Olympics. He was born in Cagliari. In 1932 he was eliminated in the quarter-finals of the bantamweight class after losing his fight to the eventual gold medalist Horace Gwynne.

References

profile

1909 births
1976 deaths
Sportspeople from Cagliari
Bantamweight boxers
Olympic boxers of Italy
Boxers at the 1932 Summer Olympics
Italian male boxers
20th-century Italian people